Crudia lanceolata is a species of plant in the family Fabaceae. It is a tree found in Peninsular Malaysia and Thailand. It is threatened by habitat loss.

References

lanceolata
Trees of Peninsular Malaysia
Trees of Thailand
Vulnerable plants
Taxonomy articles created by Polbot